Castorville is an extinct town in Stoddard County, in the U.S. state of Missouri.

A variant name was "Castor". A post office called Castor was established in 1834, and closed in 1836, the post office reopened as Castorville in 1866, and was discontinued in 1869. The community took its name from the Castor River.

References

Ghost towns in Missouri
Former populated places in Stoddard County, Missouri
1834 establishments in Missouri
Populated places established in 1834